The Marburg speech was an address given by German Vice Chancellor Franz von Papen at the University of Marburg on 17 June 1934. It is said to be the last speech made publicly, and on a high level, in Germany against National Socialism. It was done in favour of the old nationalist-militarist clique that had run Germany in the Kaiser's time, who had helped Hitler to power as a prelude to their return, only to find themselves instead pushed aside by the New Order.

Papen, encouraged by President Paul von Hindenburg, spoke out publicly about the excesses of the Nazi regime, whose ascent to power, 17 months earlier when Adolf Hitler became chancellor of Germany, had been greatly assisted by him.  In his speech, Papen called for an end to rule by terror and the clamouring for a "second revolution" by the Sturmabteilung (SA – the NSDAP's storm troopers), and the restoration of some measure of civil liberties. He also stated: "The government [must be] mindful of the old maxim 'only weaklings suffer no criticism'".

The speech was drafted by one of Papen's close advisors, Edgar Julius Jung, with assistance from Papen's secretary Herbert von Bose and Erich Klausener. It was delivered in an auditorium in the "Alte Universität," one of the main buildings in the university, but there is no plaque or any other form of commemoration of the Papen speech which, while historically labelled as Germany's last public speech against National Socialism, does not contain the term "Nazi", which the Nazis considered to be a pejorative.

Speech

Reaction
The speech made Hitler furious, and on Hitler's orders, Propaganda Minister Joseph Goebbels attempted to suppress it. However, parts of it were printed in the Frankfurter Zeitung, narrowly avoiding the increasingly invasive censorship by the government. Also, copies of the speech were circulated freely within Germany and to the foreign press. Papen told Hitler that unless the ban on the Marburg speech was lifted and Hitler declared himself willing to follow the line recommended by Papen in the speech, he would resign and would inform Hindenburg why he had resigned. Afterward, Hindenburg gave Hitler an ultimatum — unless Hitler acted immediately to end the disorder in Germany — he would declare martial law and hand the government to the army.

Two weeks later, on the Night of the Long Knives, the SS and Gestapo murdered Hitler's enemies within the NSDAP as well as various past friends, associates of people that could not be killed directly, and several conservative opponents of the Nazi regime. During this blood purge Jung, von Bose, and Klausener were also murdered. Papen's office was ransacked and he himself held under house arrest but his life was spared. After the purge, Hitler formally accepted Papen's resignation as Vice Chancellor. Papen subsequently served as ambassador to Austria and later served as ambassador to Turkey during the war.

During the Nuremberg Trials, Papen, who was one of the main defendants, cited the Marburg speech as evidence of his distance from the excesses of the Nazi government of the time. In the end, Papen was acquitted.

Literature 
 "Rede des Vizekanzlers von Papen vor dem Universitätsbund, Marburg, am 17. Juni 1934", in: Edmund Forschbach: Edgar J. Jung. Ein konservativer Revolutionär 30. Juni 1934, 1984, p. 154ff.
 "Rede des Vizekanzlers von Papen vor dem Universitätsbund, Marburg, am 17. Juni 1934", in: Sebastian Maaß: Die andere deutsche Revolution. Edgar Julius Jung und die metaphysischen Grundlagen der Konservativen Revolution, 2009, p. 134ff.
 "Vice-Chancellor Franz von Papen's Marburg Speech: A Call for More Freedom, June 17, 1934" (English-language translation), in:  Louis L. Snyder, editor:  Hitler's Third Reich; A Documentary History, Chicago: Nelson-Hall, 1981. pp. 173–177.
 "The Nazi Germany Sourcebook: AN ANTHOLOGY OF TEXTS" by Roderick Stackelberg & Sally A. Winkle

References

External links
German text of the Marburg speech

Bibliography
 
 
 
 
 
 

1934 in Germany
1934 speeches
Marburg
Franz von Papen